Dmitry Alexeyevich Ivchenko (born 8 July 1978) is a former Russian professional association football player.

Club career
He played in the Russian Football National League for FC Metallurg Lipetsk in 2009.

References

External links
 

1978 births
People from Stavropol Krai
Living people
Russian footballers
Association football defenders
FC Okean Nakhodka players
FC Metallurg Lipetsk players
FC Sokol Saratov players
FC Spartak Tambov players
FC Oryol players
Sportspeople from Stavropol Krai